John Mills (born 9 April 1900) was a Scottish footballer who played as an inside forward in the league for Rochdale, and was on the books of Blackpool without making a first team appearance. He also played non-league football for several other clubs.

References

Parkhead F.C. players
Rutherglen Glencairn F.C. players
Renfrew F.C. players
Blackpool F.C. players
Vale of Leven F.C. players
Fleetwood Town F.C. players
Rochdale A.F.C. players
Lancaster City F.C. players
Morecambe F.C. players
Scottish footballers
1900 births
Year of death missing
Association footballers not categorized by position